The Racer is a wooden racing roller coaster located at Kennywood amusement park near Pittsburgh in West Mifflin, Pennsylvania. Built by Charlie Mach and designed by the legendary John A. Miller, the Racer opened to the public in 1927 and is one of the oldest operating roller coasters in the world. It features a Möbius loop layout, in which both of its trains travel along one continuous track. Each train returns to the opposite side of the station from which it began.

Beginnings
The first Kennywood Racer was first built in 1910 as a side friction roller coaster by Frederick Ingersoll. It was a twin-track racing coaster designed by John Miller that cost nearly $50,000. When it was built, it was the largest racing coaster in the world. The original Racer had two trains racing side by side on two separate tracks, but it didn't have wheels under the track, so dips and curves were gentle. The trains consisted of three-seat cars with a seating capacity of 18. The Racer was torn down in 1926 and replaced by Kiddieland.

Rebirth

The second Racer was designed by John A. Miller in 1927 and built by Charile Mach. Because they liked Miller's previous work, Kennywood hired him to build a new twin or racing coaster. Brady McSwigan wanted a "snappy ride that wasn't too much for mothers and children to ride." It cost more than $75,000, because Miller didn't use the topography as effectively as he had with the Jack Rabbit and Pippin. The Möbius layout is caused by the setup of the station, where the trains turn away from each other upon dispatch. When the trains meet again at the lift hill, they are already on opposite sides than they were in the station, and the tracks do not split for the remainder of the ride. The new Racer's trains were locked onto the tracks, which permitted banked curves as well as curves on the dips. Andy Vettel took the final hill out of the coaster in 1949. The loading platform's facade was redesigned in 1946 by Hindenach and in 1960 by architect Bernard Liff of Liff, Justh and Chetlin. The original front was restored in 1990.

Awards
The nonprofit organization American Coaster Enthusiasts (ACE) designated Racer as an "ACE Roller Coaster Landmark" in June 2010. It is also a contributing structure to the Kennywood Park historic district, listed on the National Register of Historic Places.

See also
 Grand National at Blackpool Pleasure Beach

References

External links

Kennywood Official Website

Kennywood
Pittsburgh History & Landmarks Foundation Historic Landmarks
Roller coasters in Pennsylvania